Uganda Pentecostal University (UPU), is a private university in Uganda.

Location
The Uganda Pentecostal University is located in the heart of Kabarole District, Fort Portal City, Uganda. It originated from the Grotius School of Law and Professional Studies, which started in February 2001. The Uganda Pentecostal University is a private Institution licensed by The National Council for Higher Education (NCHE). Our programmes are on Semester System, Full time, Evening, Holiday and Weekend. The Full time programme runs from 8:00 am to 5:00 pm (Monday to Friday). The Evening programme runs from 5:00 pm to 9:00 pm through Monday to Friday. The Weekend programme runs from Friday evenings to Sunday. The coordinates of the main campus are:0°39'44.0"N, 30°15'58.0"E (Latitude:0.662222; Longitude:30.266111).

Overview
The university started operating in 2001 as the Grotius School of Law and Professional Studies, with a campus in Mengo, a neighborhood in Lubaga Division in western Kampala, Uganda's capital city. The school initially operated as part of another university. In 2004, the school was advised by the Uganda National Council for Higher Education (UNCHE) to apply for a separate license. After disagreements between the university and UNCHE were settled in court, the UNHCE licensed the university on 9 August 2005.

See also
Education in Uganda
Fort Portal
Western Region, Uganda
List of universities in Uganda
List of university leaders

References

External links
  UPU Sues Law Development Center
  UPU Wins LDC Case

Fort Portal
Kabarole District
Toro sub-region
2001 establishments in Uganda
Universities and colleges in Uganda
Educational institutions established in 2001